= Radio Kaboesna =

South Africa
- Broadcast area: Northern Cape
- Frequency: 98.0 MHz

Radio Kaboesna is a South African community radio station based in the Northern Cape.

== Coverage Areas & Frequencies ==
- Nieuwoudtville
- Brandvlei
- Williston
- Citrusdal
- And surrounding areas

== Broadcast Languages ==
- English
- Afrikaans
- Xhosa

== Broadcast Time ==
- 18 hours a day

== Target Audience ==
- LSM Groups 1 – 6

== Programme Format ==
- 40% Music
- 60% Talk

== Listenership Figures ==
Estimated Listenership
	7 Day
May 2013	12 000
Feb 2013	25 000
Dec 2012	26 000
Oct 2012	25 000
Aug 2012	0
Jun 2012	1 000

== Location ==
- Calvinia, GJ Krieling Library, Voortreekker Road, Calvinia, 8190
